Beth Lindsay is a former Scottish curler.

Teams

References

External links
 

Living people
Scottish female curlers
European curling champions
Scottish curling champions
Year of birth missing (living people)